Slim Whitman Sings is a studio album by Slim Whitman, released in 1958 on Imperial Records.

Release history 
The album was issued in the United States by Imperial Records as a 12-inch long-playing record, catalog number LP.9056.

In January 1959, it was issued in the UK by London Records, catalog number HA-P.2139.

In 1966, it was reissued in the United States in stereo under the title My Best to You, catalog number LP-12105.

Track listing

References 

1958 albums
Slim Whitman albums
Imperial Records albums